Georgios Maidanos (born 12 April 1998) is a Greek professional footballer who plays as a left-back for Super League 2 club AEL.

References

1998 births
Living people
Greek footballers
Super League Greece players
Football League (Greece) players
Gamma Ethniki players
Super League Greece 2 players
Kavala F.C. players
Athlitiki Enosi Larissa F.C. players
Association football defenders
People from Kavala (regional unit)
Footballers from Eastern Macedonia and Thrace